Yersinia pekkanenii is a Gram-negative species of Yersinia that has been isolated from water, soil, and lettuce samples. The type strain is ÅYV7.1KOH2 (= DSM 22769 = LMG 25369).

Etymology
Yersinia pekkanenii, N.L. gen. masc. n. pekkanenii, of Pekkanen, in honor of Professor Timo Pekkanen, who was a veterinarian and former head of the Department of Food and Environmental Hygiene in the Faculty of Veterinary Medicine of the University of Helsinki. He made a substantial contribution to the development of scientific research of food hygiene in Finland.

References

External links
LPSN: Species Yersinia pekkanenii

pekkanenii
Bacteria described in 2011